Denmark competed at the 1992 Summer Paralympics in Barcelona, Spain. 43 competitors from Denmark won 46 medals including 12 gold, 22 silver and 12 bronze and finished 11th in the medal table.

See also 
 Denmark at the Paralympics
 Denmark at the 1992 Summer Olympics

References 

Denmark at the Paralympics
1992 in Danish sport
Nations at the 1992 Summer Paralympics